Yianis Group is a London-based property development and investment company, wholly owned by the Cyprus-born British billionaire, John Christodoulou.

Yianis Group owns the London hotels Marriott West India Quay and Canary Riverside Plaza Hotel  at Canary Wharf.

In Manchester, Yianis Group owns the Hilton Manchester Deansgate. After a seven-year legal battle it initiated against the building's owner, North West Ground Rents Limited, part of the publicly quoted Ground Rents Income Fund, over who should be made to pay £8.9m to fund essential remedial works of the external facade, which Yianis Group subsidiary Blue Manchester Limited eventually won at the High Court in 2019, Yianis Group acquired the freehold for a 'nominal' sum. Prior to summer 2021, Yianis Group only had a 999-year lease on the commercial premises at Beetham Tower; the first 23 of its 47 floors.

Yianis Group also own Park Inn Palace, Southend and Radisson Blu, Liverpool.

Its head office is based at Westferry Circus, London.

References

Companies based in the London Borough of Tower Hamlets
Property companies based in London